In geometry, the snub dodecahedron, or snub icosidodecahedron, is an Archimedean solid, one of thirteen convex isogonal nonprismatic solids constructed by two or more types of regular polygon faces.

The snub dodecahedron has 92 faces (the most of the 13 Archimedean solids): 12 are pentagons and the other 80 are equilateral triangles. It also has 150 edges, and 60 vertices.

It has two distinct forms, which are mirror images (or "enantiomorphs") of each other. The union of both forms is a compound of two snub dodecahedra, and the convex hull of both forms is a truncated icosidodecahedron.

Kepler first named it in Latin as dodecahedron simum in 1619 in his Harmonices Mundi. H. S. M. Coxeter, noting it could be derived equally from either the dodecahedron or the icosahedron, called it snub icosidodecahedron, with a vertical extended Schläfli symbol  and flat Schläfli symbol sr{5,3}.

Cartesian coordinates
Let ξ ≈  be the real zero of the cubic polynomial , where φ is the golden ratio. Let the point p be given by
.
Let the rotation matrices M1 and M2 be given by

and

Then the 60 vertices of the snub dodecahedron are the 60 images of point p under repeated multiplication by M1 and/or M2, iterated to convergence. (The matrices M1 and M2 generate the 60 rotation matrices corresponding to the 60 rotational symmetries of a regular icosahedron.) The coordinates of the vertices are integral linear combinations of 1, φ, ξ, φξ, ξ2 and φξ2. The edge length equals

Negating all coordinates gives the mirror image of this snub dodecahedron.

As a volume, the snub dodecahedron consists of 80 triangular and 12 pentagonal pyramids.
The volume V3 of one triangular pyramid is given by:

and the  volume V5 of one pentagonal pyramid by:

The total volume is

The circumradius equals

The midradius equals ξ. This gives an interesting geometrical interpretation of the number ξ. The 20 "icosahedral" triangles of the snub dodecahedron described above are coplanar with the faces of a regular icosahedron. The midradius of this "circumscribed" icosahedron equals 1. This means that ξ is the ratio between the midradii of a snub dodecahedron and the icosahedron in which it is inscribed.

The triangle–triangle dihedral angle is given by

The triangle–pentagon dihedral angle is given by

Metric properties
For a snub dodecahedron whose edge length is 1, the surface area is

Its volume is

Its circumradius is

Its midradius is

There are two inscribed spheres, one touching the triangular faces, and one, slightly smaller, touching the pentagonal faces. Their radii are, respectively:

and

The four positive real roots of the sextic equation in R2

are the circumradii of the snub dodecahedron (U29), great snub icosidodecahedron (U57), great inverted snub icosidodecahedron (U69), and great retrosnub icosidodecahedron (U74).

The snub dodecahedron has the highest sphericity of all Archimedean solids. If sphericity is defined as the ratio of volume squared over surface area cubed, multiplied by a constant of 36 (where this constant makes the sphericity of a sphere equal to 1), the sphericity of the snub dodecahedron is about 0.947.

Orthogonal projections

The snub dodecahedron  has two especially symmetric orthogonal projections as shown below, centered on two types of faces: triangles and pentagons, corresponding to the A2 and H2 Coxeter planes.

Geometric relations

The snub dodecahedron can be generated by taking the twelve pentagonal faces of the dodecahedron and pulling them outward so they no longer touch. At a proper distance this can create the rhombicosidodecahedron by filling in square faces between the divided edges and triangle faces between the divided vertices. But for the snub form, pull the pentagonal faces out slightly less, only add the triangle faces and leave the other gaps empty (the other gaps are rectangles at this point). Then apply an equal rotation to the centers of the pentagons and triangles, continuing the rotation until the gaps can be filled by two equilateral triangles. (The fact that the proper amount to pull the faces out is less in the case of the snub dodecahedron can be seen in either of two ways: the circumradius of the snub dodecahedron is smaller than that of the icosidodecahedron; or, the edge length of the equilateral triangles formed by the divided vertices increases when the pentagonal faces are rotated.)

The snub dodecahedron can also be derived from the truncated icosidodecahedron by the process of alternation. Sixty of the vertices of the truncated icosidodecahedron form a polyhedron topologically equivalent to one snub dodecahedron; the remaining sixty form its mirror-image. The resulting polyhedron is vertex-transitive but not uniform. 

Alternatively, combining the vertices of the snub dodecahedron given by the Cartesian coordinates (above) and its mirror will form a semiregular truncated icosidodecahedron. The comparisons between these regular and semiregular polyhedrons is shown in the figure to the right.

Cartesian coordinates for the vertices of this alternative snub dodecahedron are obtained by selecting sets of 12 (of 24 possible even permutations contained in the five truncated icosidodecahedron Cartesian coordinates). The alternations are those with an odd number of minus signs in these three sets: 
(±, ±, ±(3 + φ)),
(±, ±φ2, ±(−1 + 3φ)),
(±φ, ±3, ±2φ),
and an even number of minus signs in the these two sets:
(±, ±φ, ±(1 + 2φ)),
(±(2φ − 1), ±2, ±(2 + φ)),
where φ =  is the golden ratio.

Related polyhedra and tilings

This semiregular polyhedron is a member of a sequence of snubbed polyhedra and tilings with vertex figure (3.3.3.3.n) and Coxeter–Dynkin diagram . These figures and their duals have (n32) rotational symmetry, being in the Euclidean plane for n = 6, and hyperbolic plane for any higher n. The series can be considered to begin with n = 2, with one set of faces degenerated into digons.

Snub dodecahedral graph 

In the mathematical field of graph theory, a snub dodecahedral graph is the graph of vertices and edges of the snub dodecahedron, one of the Archimedean solids. It has 60 vertices and 150 edges, and is an Archimedean graph.

See also
 Planar polygon to polyhedron transformation  animation
 ccw and cw spinning snub dodecahedron

References

 (Section 3-9)

External links

Editable printable net of a Snub Dodecahedron with interactive 3D view
The Uniform Polyhedra
Virtual Reality Polyhedra The Encyclopedia of Polyhedra
Mark S. Adams and Menno T. Kosters. Volume Solutions to the Snub Dodecahedron

Chiral polyhedra
Uniform polyhedra
Archimedean solids
Snub tilings